Roberta Lanzarotti (born 11 January 1968) is an Italian former butterfly swimmer. She competed in three events at the 1984 Summer Olympics.

References

External links
 

1968 births
Living people
Italian female butterfly swimmers
Olympic swimmers of Italy
Swimmers at the 1984 Summer Olympics
Sportspeople from the Province of Varese